The siege of Lathom House was a military confrontation between a Parliamentarian army and a Royalist stronghold in Lathom near Ormskirk in Lancashire, during the First English Civil War. The first siege lasted from late February to late May 1644, when the siege was lifted. The second siege took place a year later from July to December 1645. Lathom House was captured and slighted.

Background
James Stanley, 7th Earl of Derby, was the leading Royalist adherent in the northwest of England when the civil war broke out in 1642. The family seat of the Stanleys was Lathom House. In 1643, the Earl of Derby was ordered by King Charles to fortify the Isle of Man against a possible Scottish invasion, and then move on to the northern campaign. His French wife, Charlotte de la Tremoüille, was left in charge of what turned out to be the last remaining Royalist stronghold in Lancashire. Sir Thomas Fairfax saw Derby's absence as an opportunity to strengthen the Long Parliament's position in Lancashire and set out to conquer Lathom House. Immediately after the fall of Warrington, the Parliamentarians requested that the countess acknowledge Parliament's authority and surrender her house, but she refused on the grounds that doing so would dishonour her husband. She offered to limit herself to defending her home, and this postponed further attacks on her position.

First siege
When Fairfax arrived at Lathom House in February 1644, the Countess had made every effort to conceal the strength of the castle's fortifications. Fairfax demanded that the Countess surrender Lathom House to him. She asked for a week to consider his offer, and then insisted that it was only appropriate that he visit her at Lathom House for further negotiations. He was received as an honoured guest, but the entire household categorically rejected his terms for surrendering. He gave her two more days to consider her situation. The emissary sent two days later was scornfully dismissed.

The siege began with 2,000 Parliamentary soldiers (500 cavalry and 1,500 infantry) against a garrison of 300. The fortifications of Lathom House consisted of:
 Outer walls and embankments six feet thick
 An eight-yard moat
 Nine towers, each with six cannons, three pointing in either direction, and the Eagle Tower providing an excellent overview of the battlefield

In addition, the castle was at the lowest point in the middle of an open expanse that allowed superb views of the enemy's activities. Charlotte had assembled a militia of seasoned marksmen who were able to inflict significant losses by sniping.

John Seacome, an 18th-century historian of the House of Stanley quoted from another account A true and genuine account of the famous and ever memorable siege of Lathom-House in the County of Lancaster:

The fortifications sustained continuous cannon and mortar fire with minimal damage. The Royalists launched several successful sorties to disrupt Parliamentary efforts to set up batteries. As a result, Parliamentary forces were unable to establish any major artillery positions against the castle, and the army refused to replenish those guns that were lost or spiked during the sorties. Morale among the Roundheads also suffered greatly as the besieged shot soldiers and engineers on the battlefield.

Nevertheless, Fairfax persisted in demanding that Charlotte surrender to his forces, going so far as to obtain a letter from Lord Stanley asking for safe passage for her. She refused to surrender under any terms, rebuking messengers in increasingly disdainful tones.

After one particularly audacious sortie in late April that destroyed several Roundhead positions, Fairfax declared a day of fasting and prayer in his camp. One of the chaplains invoked the following verse from Jeremiah 50:14:

Captain Hector Schofield, a messenger from Colonel Alexander Rigby of the Roundheads, arrived to offer Charlotte an honourable surrender. She threatened to hang him from the tower gates, then asked him to convey the following while she tore the message:

A similar ultimatum issued by Rigby on 23 May prompted Charlotte to respond: "The mercies of the wicked are cruel .... unless they treated with her lord, they should never take her or any of her friends alive".

The siege was lifted on the night of 27 May as the Royalist general Prince Rupert approached Lathom with thousands of cavalry and infantry. Charlotte and her household departed for the Isle of Man, leaving the care of Lathom House to Colonel Edward Rawstorne.

Second siege
After the Parliamentary victory at the Battle of Marston Moor, which was fought 2 July 
1644, the north of England was largely under Parliamentary control apart from areas close to Royalist garrisons such as Lathom House. The next year (1645), in July, 4,000 Parliamentary troops returned to begin the second siege. Their commander Colonel Peter Egerton made Ormskirk his headquarters while his men encamped on Aughton Moss (or Aughton Moor), near Aughton Mill. Trenchfield House, on the site of this encampment, still retains the name.

The garrison did not capitulate quickly, but when it became clear that no relief could be expected, and supplies were running short, famine forced Colonel Rawstorne's hand and he surrendered at discretion to Colonel Egerton on 2 December 1645.

Aftermath
The fall of Lathom House was regarded as an event of the first importance by the Parliamentary party. Besides the material gain of twelve pieces of cannon and a large store of arms and ammunition, the Republicans had achieved a great moral triumph in the fall of the famous royalist house, and an order was issued by the 
House of Commons "for the ministers about London to give public thanks to God, on the next Lord's Day, for its surrender".

After the Restoration the property was regained by the Derby family, and in the early part of the eighteenth century it was still occasionally inhabited by them, but Knowsley Hall succeeded Lathom House as the principal seat of the Stanley family.

In Literature
 Letitia Elizabeth Landon's poem 'Lord and Lady Derby' and the notes attached reflect on Lady Derby's fortitude during the siege.

Popular culture
The song "They called her Babylon" by Steeleye Span tells the story of the siege. It appears on their 2004 album of the same name.

Citations

References

Further reading

External links

Sieges of the English Civil Wars
Battles involving Lancashire
1644 in England
Conflicts in 1644
17th century in Lancashire
Siege of